Lisa Dean Ryan (born April 30, 1972) is an American actress. She played Wanda Plenn, the girlfriend of the eponymous character in the series Doogie Howser, M.D., appearing in the series from 1989 to 1992.

Shortly afterwards she co-starred as Jessica Cohen in the series Class of '96, which ran for one season in 1993. The following year, she co-starred as Maria Cavalos in the MTV series Dead at 21. The series ended after thirteen episodes. She has also guest starred in 21 Jump Street, Beverly Hills, 90210, Boy Meets World, CSI: Crime Scene Investigation, Diagnosis: Murder, NYPD Blue and Cold Case.

In 2004, Ryan co-starred in Disney Channel film Tiger Cruise opposite Hayden Panettiere and Bill Pullman. Her last acting credit was the 2005 Hallmark Channel film Mystery Woman: Vision of a Murder with Kellie Martin.

References

External links

1972 births
20th-century American actresses
21st-century American actresses
American child actresses
American film actresses
American television actresses
Living people
Place of birth missing (living people)
Wilson Classical High School alumni